Fast Telecommunication Co. W.L.L. is an internet service provider in Kuwait, established in 2001. Owned by the Kuwaiti Shareholding Company, FAST Telco specializes in providing Internet, local and international data communication,  as well as local and international termination services for foreign carriers. It currently operates a network based on SDH/ATM/IP technologies.

References

Telecommunications companies of Kuwait
Telecommunications companies established in 2001
Companies based in Kuwait City
Kuwaiti companies established in 2001